Havens Realty Corp. v. Coleman, (1983), was a case in which the Supreme Court of the United States held that an organization may sue in its own right if it has been directly injured, for example through a "drain on the organization's resources", and that so-called "testers", individuals who sought to determine if a company was in violation of the law, may have standing in their own right.

See also 
 List of United States Supreme Court cases involving standing

References

United States Supreme Court cases
1983 in United States case law